Henrique Pereira Araújo (born 19 January 2002) is a Portuguese professional footballer who plays as a striker for EFL Championship club Watford on loan from Primeira Liga club Benfica.

Club career

Early career
Born in Funchal, the capital of the Portuguese island of Madeira, Araújo started his football career in the youth ranks of local side Andorinha in 2008, and later moved to Marítimo's in 2011. In 2018, aged 16, he went on a week trial with Benfica, who signed him and he subsequently moved from Madeira to Seixal, near Lisbon, to join Benfica's youth academy, despite also having trained with rivals Porto, who declined signing him.

Benfica

2020–22: Rise to the first team and UEFA Youth League
On 5 March 2019, Araújo signed his first professional contract with Benfica B. Araújo made his professional debut with Benfica B in a 1–0 LigaPro loss to Estoril on 4 October 2020. Following a prolific goalscoring form for the B team, to which he scored ten goals and provided three assist, Araújo was promoted to Benfica's first team by interim manager Nélson Veríssimo, making his debut on 2 February 2022, in a 2–1 home loss to Gil Vicente in the Primeira Liga.

He scored his first goal for the club on 11 March in a 1–1 home draw to Vizela. During that season, Araújo played in the 2021–22 UEFA Youth League, scoring a hat-trick in the final on 25 April, in a 6–0 win over Red Bull Salzburg to help Benfica win their first Youth League title, and their first title in European football since the 1961–62 European Cup. In his first start on 13 May, Araújo scored a brace in a 2–0 away win against Paços de Ferreira. On 5 September, he agreed to a contract extension to 2027, increasing his buyout clause to €100 million.

On 2 November, he scored his first UEFA Champions League goal in a 6–1 away win against Maccabi Haifa in their last 2022–23 UEFA Champions League group stage match, to ensure Benfica's qualification to the round of sixteen, as group winners.

2023: Loan to Watford
After making 14 appearances, finding limited first-team minutes, during Benfica's opening half of the season, on 23 January, 2023, Araújo joined English Championship club Watford on loan until the rest of the season, in order to continue his development.

International career
Araújo represented Portugal at under-17 and under-19, for a total of 7 caps, scoring four goals. On 7 October 2022, Araújo won his first cap for the under-21 side, replacing Gonçalo Ramos in the 46th minute in the 11–0 victory thrashing of Liechtenstein for the 2023 European Championship qualification campaign.

Career statistics

Club

Honours
Benfica
 UEFA Youth League: 2021–22

Individual
Liga Portugal 2 Best Young Player of the Year: 2021–22
Liga Portugal 2 Forward of the Month: February 2021
SJPF Segunda Liga Young Player of the Month: February 2021

References

External links
 
 
 

2002 births
Living people
Sportspeople from Funchal
Portuguese footballers
Portugal youth international footballers
Association football forwards
Liga Portugal 2 players
Primeira Liga players
S.L. Benfica B players
S.L. Benfica footballers
Watford F.C. players
Expatriate footballers in England
Portuguese expatriate footballers
Portuguese expatriate sportspeople in England